The Silken Affair is a 1956 British romantic comedy film directed by Roy Kellino and starring David Niven, Geneviève Page, Wilfrid Hyde-White, Joan Sims, Irene Handl and Ronald Squire. The screenplay concerns an accountant who is creative with his firm's books and uses the money to fund a romantic spree.

Cast
 David Niven as Roger Tweakham 
 Geneviève Page as Genevieve Gerard 
 Ronald Squire as Marberry 
 Beatrice Straight as Theora 
 Wilfrid Hyde-White as Sir Horace Hogg 
 Howard Marion-Crawford as Baggott 
 Dorothy Alison as Mrs. Tweakham 
 Miles Malleson as Mr. Blucher 
 Richard Wattis as Worthington 
 Joan Sims as Lady Barber 
 Irene Handl as Receptionist 
 Charles Carson as Judge 
 Harry Locke as Tobacconist 
 Martin Boddey as Detective

Critical reception
In the Radio Times, David McGillivray called it a "frivolous romantic comedy," in which, "the theme was exploited much more effectively 20 years later in Jonathan Demme's Something Wild", while TV Guide wrote, "This film tries to be a light, stylish British comedy in the sophisticated manner that is one of Britain's best exports; however, the plot is too implausible and the script doesn't give the actors much to work with. The direction compensates somewhat in a handsome looking production. The cast does give it their all, with Niven in his usual witty performance and international leading lady Page as the love interest, winning kudos from the critics for her debut in English films".

References

External links
 

1956 films
Films shot at Associated British Studios
Films directed by Roy Kellino
1956 romantic comedy films
British romantic comedy films
1950s English-language films
1950s British films
British black-and-white films